
Year 707 (DCCVII) was a common year starting on Saturday (link will display the full calendar) of the Julian calendar. The denomination 707 for this year has been used since the early medieval period, when the Anno Domini calendar era became the prevalent method in Europe for naming years.

Events 
 By place 
 Byzantine Empire 
 Arab–Byzantine War: An Umayyad army under Maslamah ibn Abd al-Malik invades Asia Minor, and lays siege to Tyana (Cappadocia). The fortress city resists, dragging the siege through the winter and into 708.

 Arabian Empire 
 The Muslim-Arabs conquer the Balearic Islands in the Mediterranean Sea (approximate date).
 The first Islamic hospital (bimaristan) is founded in Damascus (approximate date).

 Asia 
 July 18 – Emperor Monmu dies after a 10-year reign. He is succeeded by his aunt Genmei, who becomes the 43rd empress of Japan. She is the sister of former empress Jitō, and the niece and wife of late emperor Tenmu.

 By topic 
 Religion 
 October 18 – Pope John VII dies at Rome after a 19-month reign. A prolonged sede vacante exists, until the ratification of the election of Sisinnius by the Exarch of Ravenna, in early 708.

Births 
 Abd al-Rahman al-Awza'i, Muslim scholar (d. 774)
 Theudoald, mayor of the palace of Austrasia (or 708)

Deaths 

 August 7 – Li Chongjun, crown prince of the Tang Dynasty

 Abbo II, bishop of Metz (approximate date)
 Hidulf, bishop of Trier (approximate date)
 John Maron, Syriac monk and patriarch (b. 628)
 Li Duozuo, general of  the Tang Dynasty
 Wu Sansi, official of the Tang Dynasty

References